En éxtasis (English: In ecstasy) is the fourth studio album by Mexican singer Thalía, released on 12 September 1995, by EMI Latin. The album became a huge success in Latin America and other countries. This is the first album Thalía recorded on the company EMI Music. It was also her first international release.

The album produced five singles, received several certifications and consolidated her career. The lead single, "Piel Morena" was a success in the Latin market and is widely recognized as one of her signature songs, while the single "Maria la del Barrio" was very popular, thanks to the Mexican telenovela of the same name starring Thalía. The album was nominated for Pop Album of the Year at the Lo Nuestro Awards of 1996. According to Billboard magazine the album is a multimillion seller, it sold around 2 million copies worldwide, becoming in one of best-selling "Latin" albums.

Background and development
After signing a multimillion-dollar contract in 1994 with the company EMI, Thalía joined Emilio Estefan and other producers like Oscar Lopez and Kike Santander to record the material in Miami. According to Estefan, the first time he saw Thalia was at an edition of the Acapulco Festival in which "he predicted that he would collaborate with her once". Finally, when Thalía was in Miami in 1994 to promote one of her soap operas Estefan called her by phone to say, "Hey, life brought us together again [...] Gloria and me saw Marimar every night and I have a perfect song for you [come to our studio]". After that, the performer went to the famous Crescent Moon Studios to record some tracks for the album. She confessed that she "felt like the chosen one" since Estefan called her and that after hearing "Piel Morena" she commented that "it was exactly her style".

The album was released on 12 September 1995; it is characterized by including several Latin American genres, such as Latin pop, cumbia and salsa. According to Thalía, En éxtasis is "an intimate moment in which I wanted to mold my feelings on a sheet. [..] They are extreme emotions and situations that are lived in moments of love [and]" in ecstasy".

The number of songs included in En éxtasis was not the same in all the countries where it was released. This is due to the fact that, at the same time the album was being released, Thalía's most successful telenovela, María la del Barrio ("Mary from the Block"), was being broadcast in all Latin America. Even though this contributed to expand Thalía's popularity throughout the Continent, it also made different people enjoy different songs. For example, the Brazilian version of the album features, as bonus tracks, a remixed version of the songs "Amándote" ("Loving you") and "Gracias a Dios" ("Thanks God"), and the soundtrack from "María la del Barrio" ("Mary from the block").  However, this version does not include the song "Juana". On the other hand, the Argentinean version of the album features, as a bonus track, only a remixed version of "Piel Morena".

Composition
En éxtasis was produced by the Chilean producer Oscar Lopez, except for the songs "Piel Morena" and "Me Faltas Tú", which were produced by Emilio Estefan and Kike Santander.

The album includes several cover songs: "Gracias a Dios", originally by the Mexican singer Juan Gabriel; "Me Erotizas" ("You turn me on"), originally performed by the French singer Herbert Léonard, under the name "Sur des musiques érotiques" ("About erotic musics") on the 1987 album "Laissez-nous rêver" ("Let us dream"). Thalia wrote a new Spanish lyric for the song; "Fantasía" ("Fantasy"), by Gabriela Anders; "Te Quiero Tanto" ("I love you so much"), originally by Eddie Sierra on the 1990 album "Está todo bien" ("Everything is alright"). The lyric of the song had to undergo some changes, not only because it was a woman who was performing it this time, but also because its author had used some expressions which are typical of the Argentinean Spanish (such as "vos", a way of addressing someone), and referred expressly to Buenos Aires (one of the original verses goes: "estoy atrapado entre la luna y Buenos Aires" -"I am trapped between the moon and Buenos Aires"-; which Thalía changed to "estoy atrapada entre la luna y los mares" -"I am trapped between the moon and the sea"-). "Llévame Contigo" was recorded in 1992 by Argentine singer Guillermo Guido in his album "Llévame Contigo".

In Argentina, "Gracias a Dios" was the soundtrack of the soap opera "María la del Barrio" ("Mary from the block"), starring Thalía, instead of the song with which it was originally released in México (and which also became a hit).

Singles
"Piel Morena": Released as the lead single from the album. The song was Thalia's first proper international single release and became a latin classic, topping the charts in several countries. It is also considered as one of her signature songs. The song's music video, directed by Daniel Grenuer, was shot mostly in black and white. In some scenes, Thalía wears a bra made of faucets and another one that holds candles.
"Amándote": Released as the second single from the album, this song went to the latin radios top 5. The music video was shot in Miami and directed by Peter Begman. It depicts Thalía wearing a pink bikini, playing beach volleyball and rollerblading around the city. Then she goes into a retro style and dances with her friends. There is a cameo appearance of the Spanish singer Julio Iglesias. It was the second time that they collaborated appearing in a music video. The song reached number 4 in Mexico City.
"Maria la del Barrio": After the huge ratings of the Mexican telenovela of the same name starring Thalía, this song was chosen by the label to receive a proper single release, becoming the third single from the album. The music video consists of scenes from the telenovela.
"Quiero hacerte el amor": The ballad was released as the fourth single from the album. Thalia performed the song during her TV appearances and it was in the set-list for her concerts that time. She also performed it on an episode of her telenovela Rosalinda (1999). No music video was released for the song. An English version of the song was included in her album Nandito Ako (1997).
"Gracias a Dios": After the success of the previous releases, the song was released as the fifth and final single from the album and became another top 5 hit for Thalía. It was written by Mexican singer-songwriter Juan Gabriel. The song is also known for its provocative music video, directed by Benny Corral. It depicts Thalía wearing a black leather bustier and a black short wig. She shaves a man tied to a chair and wets him with a firehose. An English version of the song was included in her album Nandito Ako (1997).

Promotional singles:
"Me Faltas Tú": Released as the first promotional single in countries like Mexico, Argentina and Peru. Written by Kike Santander, the song is a guitar-driven ballad about a person missing someone. Thalia made many performances of the song in TV shows and concerts. She gave a memorable live performance to the song featuring Julio Iglesias, which was considered an iconic act by the Latin community.
"Lágrimas": Written by Aureo Baqueiro and Thalía, it was released as the second promotional single from En éxtasis. It is also the last song written by Thalia about body fluids, after "Saliva", "Sudor" and "Sangre". She performed part of the song in a music video wearing a green dress in 1994, as a part of her special in "Chabeli", a Mexican TV program. Thalia performed it a few times and also sang it on an episode of her telenovela, Rosalinda (1999).

Critical reception
{{album reviews
|rev1='StarPulse|rev1Score=
|rev2=Allmusic|rev2Score=|noprose=yes}}

The album received mixed to favorable reviews. Jason Birchmeier of Allmusic gave the album three out of five stars and wrote that "En Extasis is the first album where Thalía gets to sing well-written songs over lively productions" and that "there's some passable material interspersing these standout songs, but for the most part, Thalía gets first-rate songs to sing here and consequently she'd never sounded as good as she does here", he conclude that the album "doesn't neatly fit into any one category such as banda or Latin pop. It's dynamic music propelled with bits of cumbia, bits of pop, bits of salsa, bits of banda -- a bit of most everything great about Latin music, in fact." In his review for Amazon Joey Guerra said that "there are a few limp moments on En Extasis, but Thalia is clearly coming into her own as a singer" he also praised the songs "Piel Morena", "Amandote" and "Gracias a Dios", being the first one his favorite song of the album. Colombian newspaper El Tiempo said that only two tracks of the album are good, "Piel Morena" and "Me faltas tú" "thanks to their lyrics, and especially their catchy rhythms, much like the style of Colombian Kike Santander, the author of these songs".

Commercial performance En éxtasis gave Thalía multiple gold and platinum records and made her win several prizes worldwide. She received a lot of certifications in an only day in 1997, during the inauguration of EMI's Miami office. The event received coverage of over 15 different TV channels and music directors from several countries.

In Argentina the album was the second best selling album of 1996 to be released by EMI music with over 100,000 copies sold that year and the album's lead single being used in a soap opera which eventually helped her become the first female Mexican artist to be certified with double Platinum award. She then became first female Mexican soloist with a Gold certification in Brazil —and the only one until the release of Mi Delirio by Anahí in 2009. En éxtasis sold 30,000 copies during the first 15 days in Brazil, and as November 1997, Thalía became the biggest-selling female Mexican act there, with 150,000 units sold with this album. Brazilian sales increased to 190,000 units as of March 1998 according to Jornal do Commercio.

In 1997, the album reached number 1 in Paraguay. Besides, this album paved the way to have successful in an international music career on which she was going to embark in the years to come. As of July 1996, En éxtasis sold a half million copies worldwide. Eventually, it sold around 2 million units and Billboard reported that En éxtasis is a "multimillion seller".

Bailando en éxtasisEn éxtasis became such a success worldwide that EMI decided to release a special edition of it, titled Bailando en Éxtasis'' ("Dancing in Ecstasy") in 1996, which contained only remixed versions of the most popular songs featured in the original album, plus a karaoke version of "Piel Morena". This was a limited edition and was not available in many Latin American countries (for instance, in Argentina).

Track listing

Charts

Weekly charts

Year-end charts

Certifications and sales

Credits

Thalía – vocals
Gabriela Anders – background vocals
Edwin Bonilla – bongos, conga, maracas, timbales, tambora timbal
Francisco Centeno – bass
Doris Eugenio – vocals, background vocals
Steve Ferrone – drums
Sammy Figueroa – percussion
Eddy Ganz – background vocals
Didi Gutman – piano, keyboards
Jeff Kievit – trumpet
Amaury Lopez – background vocals
Juanito Marquez – guitar
Bobby Martinez – saxophone
Archie Pena – drums
Nicki Richards – background vocals
Kike Santander – bass, guitar, percussion, background vocals
Ira Siegel – guitar
Dana Teboe – trombone
Lori-Ann Velez – background vocals
Francisco "STAR" Del - drum machine and keyboards

Production
Marcelo Añez – assistant engineer
Scott Canto – assistant engineer
Sean Chambers – assistant engineer
David Dachinger – engineer, mixing
Pablo Flores – remixing
Don Grossinger – mastering
Scott Perry – engineer
Mario Ruíz – executive producer
Eric Schilling – engineer
Ted Stein – engineer

See also
1995 in Latin music
 List of best-selling Latin albums

References

1995 albums
Thalía albums
Spanish-language albums
EMI Latin albums
Albums produced by Emilio Estefan
Albums produced by Kike Santander